Deven Green (born January 31, 1975) is a Canadian comedian who produces comedy parody videos, including as the satirical character Mrs. Betty Bowers, "America's Best Christian".

Early life and career 
Green was born and raised in Thompson, Manitoba, Canada, and holds dual Canadian–U.S. citizenship. She began working as a professional figure skater and later started her comedy career at The Second City in Toronto. She has acknowledged comedian Harland Williams as giving her a big break in Canada by casting her in the Canadian Broadcasting Corporation stand-up comedy show Comics!. She later moved to Los Angeles to further her career.

Career

Parody work 
Green portrays the satirical character Mrs. Betty Bowers, "America's Best Christian", created and written by writer Andrew Bradley. 

Green's comedic work also includes videos that offer her comic parodies and commentary of existing footage of other entertainers. Green is best known in this genre for her viral video parody of "Welcome to My Home" starring soap opera actress Brenda Dickson. 

In 2018 Green was a recipient of the American Humanist Association's Humanist Arts Award.

Print and modelling 
Green has been a panel member of Star magazine's weekly Style Squad since May 2012.

The nail lacquer colour Deven Green was released by OCCmakeup at Sephora.

She appeared as a spokesmodel for OCCmakeup's 2014 Spring Collection "Plastic Passion" and OCCmakeup's 2014 Fall/Winter Collection "Unknown Pleasures".

Filmography

References

External links 
 
 
 
 
 

1975 births
Living people
21st-century Canadian comedians
21st-century American comedians
Canadian women comedians
Canadian parodists
Canadian emigrants to the United States
People from Thompson, Manitoba
Comedians from Manitoba